The 2019–20 Alcorn State Braves basketball team represented Alcorn State University in the 2019–20 NCAA Division I men's basketball season. The Braves, led by fifth-year head coach Montez Robinson, played their home games at the Davey Whitney Complex in Lorman, Mississippi as members of the Southwestern Athletic Conference. They finished the season 15–15, 11–7 in SWAC play to finish in a three-way tie for fourth place. They lost in the first round of the SWAC tournament to Jackson State.

Previous season
The Braves finished the 2018–19 season 10–21 overall, 6–12 in SWAC play, to finish in a tie for 7th place. In the SWAC tournament, they were defeated by Prairie View A&M in the quarterfinals.

Roster

Schedule and results

|-
!colspan=12 style=| Non-conference regular season

|-
!colspan=9 style=| SWAC regular season

|-
!colspan=12 style=| SWAC tournament
|-

|-

Source

References

Alcorn State Braves basketball seasons
Alcorn State Braves
Alcorn State Braves basketball
Alcorn State Braves basketball